Sleaford and North Hykeham is a parliamentary constituency in Lincolnshire, England which elects a single Member of Parliament (MP) to the House of Commons of the UK Parliament. It has been represented since 2016 by Dr Caroline Johnson, who is a member of the Conservative Party. The seat was created in 1997 and has always been represented by Members of Parliament (MPs) from the Conservative Party; like all British constituencies, it elects one candidate by the first-past-the-post voting system. Johnson became the MP for the constituency after a by-election in December 2016, following the resignation of the previous MP for the seat, Stephen Phillips. The constituency is considered a safe seat for the Conservatives.

Boundaries 

1997–2010: The District of North Kesteven except for the ward of Bracebridge Heath, and the District of South Kesteven wards of Ermine, Heath, Loveden, Saxonwell, and Witham Valley.

2010–present: The District of North Kesteven wards of Ashby de la Launde, Bassingham, Billinghay, Branston and Mere, Brant Broughton, Cliff Villages, Cranwell and Byard's Leap, Eagle and North Scarle, Heckington Rural, Heighington and Washingborough, Kyme, Leasingham and Roxholm, Martin, Metheringham, North Hykeham Forum, North Hykeham Memorial, North Hykeham Mill, North Hykeham Moor, North Hykeham Witham, Osbournby, Ruskington, Sleaford Castle, Sleaford Holdingham, Sleaford Mareham, Sleaford Navigation, Sleaford Quarrington, Sleaford Westholme, and Waddington West, and the District of South Kesteven wards of Barrowby, Ermine, Heath, Loveden, Peascliffe, Saxonwell, and Witham Valley.

The constituency covers the towns of Sleaford and North Hykeham and a large area of rural Lincolnshire south west of Lindsey. The constituency's boundaries roughly correspond to those of North Kesteven local government district. In their formative proposals for 1997, the Boundary Commission for England proposed calling the new constituency Mid Lincolnshire, however the name was changed to its current form during the local inquiry process. The inclusion of North Hykeham in the constituency title was criticised by the author and psephologist Robert Waller in 1995, on the grounds that North Hykeham was effectively an overspill area of the City of Lincoln; however, not on the grounds of its actual inclusion, as its local government authority has long been seen as linked with the villages to the south in this seat, and wholly separate from the city.

Following another Boundary Commission review, the constituency boundaries with two of its neighbouring seats Lincoln and Grantham and Stamford were changed for the 2010 general election.

The areas within the constituency of Sleaford and North Hykeham are under the control and come under the responsibility of Lincolnshire County Council for the provision of certain public services, such as roads and local authority education.

History

1997–2015
Douglas Hogg moved to represent Sleaford and North Hykeham from the previously existing Grantham constituency, a safe Conservative seat, which he had held since 1979. At the 1997 general election, Hogg won 43.9% of the vote, giving him a majority of 5,123 votes (9.6%) ahead of the second-placed Labour Party. At the 2001 general election, the Conservatives increased their vote share by 5.7%, while the Labour Party's vote share decreased; the seat had a majority of 8,622 votes (17.7%), which was the 104th-smallest percentage majority out of the 166 seats won by the Conservatives. At the 2005 general election, Hogg won a majority of 12,705 votes (23.8%); this was the 35th-largest absolute majority (number of votes) and 52nd-largest percentage majority of the 198 seats won by the Conservative Party. UKIP, a minor party, won 5% of the vote in the constituency (coming fourth), retaining its deposit. He stood down at the 2010 general election owing to controversy over his expenses claims, making him the first MP to resign because of the scandal.

Hogg was replaced by fellow Conservative Stephen Phillips. In 2010, he won a majority of 19,905 votes (33.4%); the Liberal Democrats came second. Out of the 650 UK Parliament constituencies contested at the election, Sleaford and North Hykeham had the 14th-largest absolute majority and the 72nd-largest percentage majority. The Lincolnshire Independents, a minor party, won 6.4% of the vote in the seat and came fourth; as this was more than 5%, the party retained its deposit. At the 2015 general election, Phillips won a majority of 24,115 votes (38.9%), with the Labour Party coming second in the seat. This made the constituency the 34th-safest by absolute majority, and the 99th-safest by percentage majority, out of the 650 constituencies.

2016 by-election

Phillips stood down as an MP on 4 November 2016, owing to "irreconcilable differences" with the Government over the issue of Brexit. This triggered a by-election within the constituency, which was held on 8 December; Caroline Johnson retained the seat for the Conservatives with a large majority.

2017–present
At the 2017 general election, Johnson won a majority of 25,237 votes; this was the second-largest majority of any seat in the East Midlands region (after Leicester South. Johnson's 42,245 votes were the greatest tally for her party in that election. The majority in percentage was surpassed by six candidates of the same party. At the 2019 general election, the Conservatives increased their majority further to 32,565. This was the largest Conservative majority (measured by number of votes) at the election, and the largest majority of any seat in the East Midlands.

The seat is overweight in electorate meaning each elector's potential vote counts for about 15% less than the smallest mainland seats and each potential vote has 24.4% of the potential effect as the remote seat covering Na h-Eileanan an Iar (the Western Isles or Outer Hebrides).  A seat consisting of the latter seat multiplied by four times its electorate would, narrowly, be smaller than this seat's adult eligible voters (electorate).

Members of Parliament
{| class="wikitable"
|-
!colspan="2"|Election!!Member
!Party
|-
|style="background-color: " |
| 1997
| Douglas Hogg
|Conservative
|-
|style="background-color: " |
| 2010
| Stephen Phillips
|Conservative
|-
|style="background-color: " |
| 2016 by-election  
| Caroline Johnson
| Conservative

Elections

Elections in the 2010s

Elections in the 2000s

Elections in the 1990s

See also 
List of parliamentary constituencies in Lincolnshire

References

Notes

Citations

Works cited

Parliamentary constituencies in Lincolnshire
Constituencies of the Parliament of the United Kingdom established in 1997